Nicolás Raúl Benavídez (born 10 January 1992) is an Argentine professional footballer who plays as a left back for Olimpo.

Career
Benavídez started his career in La Plata with Gimnasia y Esgrima. He appeared in thirteen fixtures for the Primera B Nacional team in 2011–12, which included his professional debut on 13 February 2012 against Atlético Tucumán at the Estadio Monumental José Fierro. Eight further appearances occurred across 2012–13 as the club won promotion to the Primera División. In June 2014, after one top-flight appearance, Benavídez was loaned back to Primera B Nacional with Ferro Carril Oeste. He scored his first senior goal on 16 November in a 3–0 win over Guaraní Antonio Franco. He played nine times.

January 2016 saw Benavídez join Almagro on loan. He returned to his parent club in June after a sole match for them; a three-minute cameo versus Gimnasia y Esgrima of San Salvador de Jujuy. Gimnasia y Esgrima were to be Benavídez's next club, with the defender signing on 30 June 2018.

Career statistics
.

References

External links

1992 births
Living people
People from Tandil
Argentine footballers
Association football defenders
Primera Nacional players
Argentine Primera División players
Club de Gimnasia y Esgrima La Plata footballers
Ferro Carril Oeste footballers
Club Almagro players
Gimnasia y Esgrima de Jujuy footballers
Olimpo footballers
Sportspeople from Buenos Aires Province